Bruceanol G is a cytotoxic quassinoid isolated from Brucea antidysenterica with potential antitumor and antileukemic properties.

See also
 Bruceanol

References

Quassinoids